Mark F. Weber is an American politician, farmer, and businessman serving as a member of the North Dakota Senate from the 22nd district. Elected in November 2020, he assumed on December 1, 2020.

Education 
Weber earned a Bachelor of Science degree in mechanized agriculture and Master of Science in agricultural economics from North Dakota State University.

Career 
Weber has worked as a farmer and was the director of the Northern Crops Institute in Fargo, North Dakota. He was elected to the North Dakota Senate in November 2020 and assumed office on December 1, 2020.

References 

Living people
North Dakota State University alumni
Republican Party North Dakota state senators
People from Cass County, North Dakota
Year of birth missing (living people)